William Jenkins may refer to:

 William Jenkins (1825–1895), Welsh general manager of Consett Iron Company
 William Jenkins (coal merchant) (1878–1968), British politician, former MP for Brecon and Radnor
 William (Bill) Jenkins (1925–2002), youngest Royal Marine to win a DSO in the Second World War
 William Jenkins (Labour politician) (1871–1944), former MP for Neath
 William Jenkins (Canadian politician) (1921–1995), politician in the Legislative Assembly of Manitoba
 William Miller Jenkins (1856–1941), American politician
 William Jenkins (veterinarian), former president of Louisiana State University
 William Jenkins (Northern Ireland politician) (1904–?), Lord Mayor of Belfast
 William Jenkins (Australian politician) (1895–1963), member of the South Australian House of Assembly
 William Jenkins (New Zealand) (1813–1902), New Zealand sailor, whaler, accommodation-house keeper, farmer, market gardener, horse-trainer and jockey
 William Jenkins (cricketer) (1788–1844), English cricketer
 William O. Jenkins (1878–1963), American businessman who made great wealth in Mexico
 William Stanley Jenkins (1890–?), Canadian flying ace during World War I
 William Fitzgerald Jenkins, better known under his pen name Murray Leinster (1896–1975), American science fiction author
 William Franklin Jenkins (1876–1961), Justice of the Georgia Supreme Court
 William A. Jenkins (1917–2022), United States Coast Guard rear admiral
 William Jenkins (priest) (born 1963), bishop coadjutor-elect in the Reformed Episcopal Church

See also
 Bill Jenkins (disambiguation)
 Billy Jenkins (disambiguation)